Leo LEE Tung-hai  (1921–2010) was the Chairman of the Board of the Tung Wah Group of Hospitals from 1970–1971, businessman and philanthropist in Hong Kong. Lee died on 8 June 2010.

Career
Lee founded the Tung Tai Trading Corporation in 1952. Further companies in the Tung Tai Group followed with Dr Lee serving as Chairman. He also served as a Member of the 7th Chinese People's Political Consultative Conference and a Standing Committee Member of the 8th and 9th Chinese People's Political Consultative Conferences.

Awards
In 1983, he was conferred an Officer of the Most Excellent Order of the British Empire (OBE). In 1999, Lee was awarded a Gold Bauhinia Star by the Hong Kong Government and an Honorary Doctor of Laws by the University of Victoria, Canada. In 2002, Lee became an Honorary Citizen of Zhongshan City in Guangdong, China. In 2006, Lee was awarded with the Grand Bauhinia Medal by the Hong Kong Government.

References

1921 births
2010 deaths
Date of birth missing
Officers of the Order of the British Empire
Hong Kong businesspeople
Members of the National Committee of the Chinese People's Political Consultative Conference
Recipients of the Gold Bauhinia Star
Recipients of the Grand Bauhinia Medal
Members of the Preparatory Committee for the Hong Kong Special Administrative Region
Members of the Selection Committee of Hong Kong
Hong Kong justices of the peace